NATO headquarters may refer to:

 NATO headquarters, the headquarters of the North Atlantic Treaty Organization in Brussels, Belgium
 Supreme Headquarters Allied Powers Europe,  the headquarters of the North Atlantic Treaty Organization's Allied Command Operations (ACO), located at Casteau, Belgium
 Allied Command Transformation, a military command of the North Atlantic Treaty Organization, located in Norfolk, Virginia